Planet Funk is a self-titled compilation album by the Italian electronic group Planet Funk, released by Universal Music in 2009. It contains all 15 of the group's singles, plus three new songs.

Track listing
 "Lemonade" – 3:41
 vocals by Dan Black
 written by A. Neri, D. Black, D. Canu, M. Baroni and S. Della Monica
 "Inside All the People" – 4:57 (Non Zero Sumness, 2002)
 vocals by Dan Black
 written by Alessandro Neri, Dan Black, Domenico Canu, Marco Baroni and Sergio Della Monica
 "Stop Me" – 3:47 (The Illogical Consequence, 2005)
 vocals by John Graham
 written by Alessandro Neri, Domenico Canu, John Graham, Marco Baroni, Sergio Della Monica and Simon Duffy
 "Who Said" – 3:36 (Non Zero Sumness, 2002)
 vocals by Dan Black
 written by Alessandro Neri, Dan Black, Domenico Canu, Gary Numan, Marco Baroni and Sergio Della Monica
 "Too Much TV" – 3:04
 vocals by Dan Black
 written by Alessandro Neri, Dan Black, Domenico Canu, Marco Baroni and Sergio Della Monica
 "The Switch" – 5:15 (Non Zero Sumness, 2002)
 vocals by Dan Black
 written by Alessandro Neri, Dan Black, Domenico Canu, Marco Baroni and Sergio Della Monica
 "Come Alive" – 4:17 (The Illogical Consequence, 2005)
 vocals by John Graham
 written by Alessandro Neri, Domenico Canu, John Graham, Marco Baroni, Sergio Della Monica and Simon Duffy
 "Chase the Sun" – 3:53 (Non Zero Sumness, 2002)
 vocals by Auli Kokko
 written by Alessandro Neri, Auli Kokko, Domenico Canu, Marco Baroni and Sergio Della Monica
 "Paper Feathers" – 4:44
 vocals by Dan Black
 written by Alessandro Neri, Dan Black, Domenico Canu, Marco Baroni and Sergio Della Monica
 "Paraffin" – 4:31 (Non Zero Sumness, 2002)
 vocals by Dan Black
 written by Alessandro Neri, Dan Black, Domenico Canu, Marco Baroni and Sergio Della Monica
 "Everyday" – 4:20 (The Illogical Consequence, 2005)
 vocals by John Graham
 written by Alessandro Neri, Domenico Canu, John Graham, Marco Baroni, Sergio Della Monica and Simon Duffy
 "It's Your Time" – 2:59 (Static, 2006)
 vocals by Luke Allen
 written by Alessandro Neri, Domenico Canu, Hugh Harris, Luke Allen, Marco Baroni and Sergio Della Monica
 "Peak" – 3:47 (The Illogical Consequence, 2005)
 vocals by Dan Black
 written by Alessandro Neri, Dan Black, Domenico Canu, Marco Baroni, Sergio Della Monica and Simon Duffy
 "Static" – 4:57 (Static, 2006)
 vocals by Luke Allen
 written by Alessandro Neri, Domenico Canu, Hugh Harris, Luke Allen, Marco Baroni and Sergio Della Monica
 "All Man's Land" – 5:33 (Non Zero Sumness, 2002)
 vocals by Sally Doherty
 written by Alessandro Neri, Domenico Canu, Marco Baroni, Sally Doherty and Sergio Della Monica
 "Ultraviolet Days" – 4:48 (The Illogical Consequence, 2005)
 vocals by John Graham
 written by Alessandro Neri, Domenico Canu, John Graham, Marco Baroni, Sergio Della Monica and Simon Duffy
 "One Step Closer" – 6:43  [Where Is the Max](Non Zero Sumness, 2002)
 vocals by Jim Kerr
 written by Alessandro Neri, Domenico Canu, Jim Kerr, Marco Baroni and Sergio Della Monica
 "The End" – 4:34 (The Illogical Consequence, 2005)
 vocals by John Graham
 written by Alessandro Neri, Domenico Canu, John Graham, Marco Baroni, Sergio Della Monica and Simon Duffy

Charts

References

2009 greatest hits albums
Planet Funk albums